Federal Route 174 comprising Jalan Sultan Zainal Abidin and Jalan Sultan Mahmud is a federal road in Kuala Terengganu, Terengganu, Malaysia. The Kilometre Zero of the Federal Route 174 starts at Batu Burok.

Features

At most sections, the Federal Route 174 was built under the JKR R5 road standard, with a speed limit of 90 km/h.

List of junctions

Jalan Sultan Mahmud

Jalan Sultan Zainal Abidin

References

Malaysian Federal Roads